The Uganda Deposit Protection Fund (UDPF) is a Ugandan government agency that provides deposit insurance to depositors in Ugandan banks and deposit-taking microfinance institutions. The UDPF was created in July 1994. The law was amended in 2004 to create an independent agency, separate from the Bank of Uganda.

Location
The headquarters of UDPF are located on AHA Towers Plot 7 Lourdel Road, in Kampala, the capital and largest city of Uganda. The coordinates of the UDPF headquarters are 00°18'50.0"N, 32°34'47.0"E (Latitude:0.313903; Longitude:32.579711).

Overview
As of 31 December 2015, the BoU administered the UDPF and held UGX:312.8 billion belonging to UDPF. The bank held another UGX:9.6 billion belonging to the Uganda Microfinance Deposit Protection Fund (UMDPF), which the bank also administered.

Legislation passed in 2016 provided for the merging of the UDPF and the UMDPF, with the new agency being separate from the BoU. Those changes had not yet been implemented as of August 2016. The World Bank assisted with the process of separating the functions of the new agency from those of the BoU.

In February 2022, the Daily Monitor reported that the UDPF had total assets of UGX:966 billion (approx. US$275.5 million), as of 30 June 2021. At that time, the total assets of Uganda's banking sector were UGX:39.7 trillion (approx. US$11.3 billion), with total customer deposits of UGX:31 trillion (approx. US$8.84 billion), in 19.1 million customer accounts.

Operations
The DPF is funded by premiums charged to every licensed deposit-accepting financial institution in the country. Each account is protected up to UGX:10 million. The law provides for all depositors to be paid within 90 days of a bank failure and that the failing institution must be sold by auctioning its assets within six months of its seizure by the BoU. If the BoU determines that the failed institution will fetch a better economic return if sold as a whole, then it will re-open under new ownership and management, provided the new owners and managers meet the approval of the BoU.

In September 2019, Uganda's Finance Ministry increased the amount of protected deposits from UShs3 million (US$830) to UShs10 million (US$2,760). As of that date, the fund covered deposits in 34 contributing financial institutions, including 24 commercial banks, 5 credit institutions and 5 micro finance deposit-taking institutions.

History
Following the collapse of Teefe Bank in 1993, the BoU lost money when it was forced to reimburse depositors from its own coffers. In July 1994, the BoU established the fund as a department of the bank, with three objectives:

1. Protect small depositors from losing their savings if and when banks failed

2. Maintain the stability of Uganda's financial sector and payments system, and

3. Enhance public confidence in the banking system and the financial sector of the country.

The 2004 Financial Institutions Act provided for the formation of the DPF. The UMDPF was created to protect depositors in deposit-taking microfinance institutions in 2003.

See also
Banking in Uganda

References

External links
Website of Deposit Protection Fund

Government agencies of Uganda
Finance in Uganda
Deposit insurance
Organizations established in 1994
Kampala District
1994 establishments in Uganda